Mulock is a dispersed rural community and unincorporated place in the municipality of West Grey, Grey County in Southwestern Ontario, Canada, named for William Mulock.

Mulock Christian Fellowship, a church, is and Durham (Mulock) Airport was located in the community. The Saugeen River flows by southwest of Mulock.

See also

 List of unincorporated communities in Ontario

References

Communities in Grey County